Matej Siva (born 10 October 1984) is a Slovak football defender who currently plays for TJ Iskra Borčice.

Club career
Siva was transferred to Spartak Trnava in June 2014. He made his league debut for them against Dunajská Streda on 20 July 2014.

References

External links
FK Teplice profile

1984 births
Living people
Slovak footballers
OFK 1948 Veľký Lapáš players
MFK Ružomberok players
Spartak Myjava players
FC Spartak Trnava players
FK Iskra Borčice players
Slovak Super Liga players
FK Teplice players
Czech First League players
Expatriate footballers in the Czech Republic
Sportspeople from Martin, Slovakia
Association football fullbacks